Iveagh United Football Club is a Northern Irish intermediate football club based in Dunmurry, Belfast, playing in Division 1C of the Northern Amateur Football League. The club, founded in 1965 as Peter Pan, and originally based in west Belfast, has been a member of the Amateur League since 1965. Club colours are white, green and black.

The club participates in the Irish Cup.

External links
 Club web site

References

 

Association football clubs in Northern Ireland
Association football clubs in Belfast
Northern Amateur Football League clubs